The Protei-5 (Протей-5) is a small Russian one-man diver propulsion vehicle often used by Russian commando frogmen. It is battery electric powered, using six non-sealed lead–acid batteries. It clips on under the diver with a clip over each shoulder and one up between his legs. Its casing is aluminium. It was intended to be clipped onto the outside of a submarine; near the operation site the frogmen would airlock out underwater and unhitch their Protei 5's and ride them to the operation site. It seems to have been intended to be ridden fast and far rather than for complicated maneuvering.

The Russian for this sort of "diver-carrying vehicle" is буксировщик buksirovshchik = "tugger".

The rod sticking out of the front end was meant to carry a lamp.
The lever on the left bow is the motor's on/off switch. There is no speed control.
The frogman steers with the diving fins on his feet.
Overall size: 66 centimetres (2 feet 2 inches) wide, 69 centimetres (2 feet 3 inches) high, 1.75  (5 feet 9 inches) long.
Size of hull: 66 centimetres (2 feet 2 inches) wide, 38 centimetres (1 feet 3 inches) high, 1.45 m (4 feet 9 inches) long.

A frogman with an IDA71 rebreather riding a Protei-7 could pass through a hole  square.

Only two Protei-5 are known to exist outside of the ex-USSR:
 One is currently in upstate New York, USA.
 One is fully operational in New Jersey, USA; it was made in 1970 and its motor is noisy. This example was imported along with some 150 IDA-59, IDA-64, IDA-71, and AKA-60 rebreathers, all ex-Soviet military combat swimmers' systems.

Similar designs have been made in Russia, including a model called Proton.

The name "Protei" is a Russian version of the classical Latin / Greek mythological name Proteus.

References

External links
article "Riding on Proton" by Afonchenko (in Russian, with 6 images, about diving with a similar craft called a Proton)
Search for Youtube videos about the Protei-5
Some Protei 5's got into American hands and were filmed used by a civilian; to at least one of them a civilian user (who also repainted it) added a long front pair of handlebars, which is not part of them as made in the USSR.

Diver propulsion equipment
Military equipment of the Soviet Union
Soviet inventions